The Wales Genocide Memorial is a monument in the garden of the Temple of Peace in Cardiff, Wales, dedicated to the victims of the Armenian genocide that took place in Ottoman Empire carried out by the Turkish government against the Armenian population from 1915 to 1922.

Unveiling 
The memorial was erected and unveiled on November 2, 2007, at an initiative of Wales-Armenian Society. The opening of the monument was consecrated in a service conducted by Bishop Nathan Hovhannisian, Primate of the Armenian Apostolic Church of Great Britain. The ceremony was attended by Lord Dafydd Elis-Thomas Presiding Officer of the National Assembly of Wales, David Yeoman, the Assistant Bishop of Llandaff, and Vahe Gabrielyan, Armenian Ambassador to the UK.

Over 300 people attended the opening ceremony. Members of the Turkish community protested, saying the genocide never happened.

Desecration 

In the early hours of January 27, 2008 the ornate Armenian Cross was smashed by a hammer, which was found at the scene. Eilian Williams of Wales Armenia Solidarity condemned the attack, which happened just hours before a memorial service could take place in remembrance of Holocaust, Armenian genocide and Hrant Dink.

Eilian Williams has said "We shall repair the cross again and again, no matter how often it is desecrated. We also challenge the UK government and the Turkish Embassy to condemn this racist attack."

See also 
 Armenian genocide
 List of Armenian genocide memorials
 Armenian Genocide Remembrance Day

External links
 Armenia-Wales.org
 Armenian Community and Church Council of Great Britain
 Armenian Genocide Monument in Wales Smashed on UK's Holocaust Memorial Day

References 

2007 sculptures
Armenian genocide denial
Armenian genocide memorials
Buildings and structures in Cardiff
Monuments and memorials in Cardiff
Vandalized works of art in the United Kingdom